Local Kung Fu is an Assamese Kung fu comedy film directed by Kenny Deori Basumatary and the second Assamese film to have a nationwide release. It has also been dubbed as India’s first Kung fu film. The plot revolves around Charlie, "an ordinary boy from Guwahati with a delicate stomach", his girlfriend and a number of madcap characters.

Plot
Charlie is living with his uncle, a Kung Fu tutor, and cousin, Johnny, in Guwahati. He had shifted from Tezpur, due to his girlfriend, Sumi, being sent away to Guwahati in an attempt by her father to keep them apart. Sumi is living with her uncle and aunt.

Charlie arrives at  Sumi's house and introduce himself as Montu (a potential future husband of Sumi, whom Sumi had chased away earlier) to her uncle: Bhobananda Das. A local gang, headed by Dullu, an Kung Fu enthuasist, intend to open a Liquor shop, but Bhobananda Das, an Excise Inspector, declines to give them the required license, due to the location being in front of a Pre-school institute. The gang tries to bribe him, which Das refuses. The gang tries to cough up information from rival gang on how to bring Das round, but it turns out that Das had declined their bribe's as well, and tells that Das is incorruptible and stubborn. The gang resorts to threatening his family. When they threaten Sumi, Charlie intervenes. In retaliation, Dullu and his gang beat up Charlie.

On the other hand, Charlie's cousin, Johnny, is being spoiled by his two friends, Bonzo and KK, by peer pressuring him into consuming Alcohol and Tobacco. Charlie finds out about Johnny intoxication and decides to inform and complain to Bonzo and KK's parents. In a twist, Bonzo and KK have no parents and their brother/foster parent turns out to be Dullu. Dullu is amused at finding Charlie at his house, whom he had encountered before in a fight. Nonetheless, he allows Charlie to explain the purpose of his visit. Dullu is furious of his wards/brothers intoxication habits and hand them a harsh punishment. Charlie inadvertently bumps into Bhobananda Das and real Montu simultaneously. Bhobananda find out the truth about Charlie masquerading as Montu. Bhobananda reprimand both Charlie and Montu. Sometime later, Charlie make amends with Sumi uncle.

Bonzo and KK tries to get revenge from Charlie, but get beaten up themselves. In return, Dullu challenges Charlie to a fight. Charlie sets the term that if he wins, Dullu and his gang will stop interfering into his and Sumi's family's. Dullu agrees stating his term that if Charlie loses, he will leave Guwahati forever. In preparation for the fight, Charlie begins to learn and improve his Wing Chun and Taekwondo under the tutelage of his uncle. In the final showdown, Charlie arrive to fight one on one with Dullu. After a long and toilsome fight Charlie manages to defeat Dullu, thus ending their feud.

Cast
 Kenny Basumatary as Charlie.
 Sangeeta Nair as Sumi Das.
 Utkal Hazowary as Dullu
 Kabindra Dass as Bhobananda Das.
 Bonny Deori as Bonzo.
 Johnny Deori as Johnny.
 Ronnie Deori as KK.
 Bibhash Singha as Tansen
 Amar Singha Deori as Charlie's Uncle.
 Tony Deori Basumatary as Montu.

Reception

Accolades
Local Kung Fu has been nominated for best Assamese film in the inaugural Filmfare awards for the Eastern region. Kenny Basumatary was nominated for best director.

Sequel
Local Kung Fu 2 was released on 19 April 2017.

References

External links
 
  Everybody Loves Kung Fu
 Best Assamese film in the inaugural Filmfare awards

2013 films
Films set in Assam
2010s Assamese-language films